Sam Houston State University (SHSU or Sam) is a public university in Huntsville, Texas. It was founded in 1879 and is the third-oldest public college or university in Texas. It is one of the first normal schools west of the Mississippi River and the first in Texas. It is named for Sam Houston, who made his home in the city and is buried there.

SHSU is a member of the Texas State University System and has an enrollment of more than 20,000 students across over 80 undergraduate, 59 master's, and 10 doctoral degree programs. The university also offers more than 20 online bachelor's and graduate degrees.

History

19th and 20th centuries
The Sam Houston State University campus was originally home to Austin College, the Presbyterian institution that relocated to Sherman, Texas, in 1876. Austin Hall was constructed in 1851 and is the oldest university building west of the Mississippi still in operation. It was renovated in 2012 and is used today for special meetings and events. Notably, Sam Houston himself attended and participated in the original dedication of the building.

Created by legislation signed by Governor Oran M. Roberts on San Jacinto Day, April 21, 1879, Sam Houston Normal Institute's dedicated goal was to train teachers for the public schools of Texas. It was the first teacher-training school in the southwestern United States. On October 10 of the same year, the first class of 110 students and four faculty commenced instruction. The first president of the school, Bernard Mallon, died eleven days after the institute opened.

The one-room Peabody Memorial Library was the first free-standing campus library in Texas; it was constructed in 1901 with funds provided by the George Peabody Foundation. According to the Normal Institute's catalogue, the library was "a very handsome structure, and especially designed for the purpose for which it is to be used. It is said that no school of this kind in the South has a Building equal to it." Fully restored, it is now used as a venue for special university events.

When the university first opened, students received a certification to teach in the state's elementary and secondary schools. After 1919, the university began to award bachelor's degrees. In 1936, the school awarded its first postbaccalaureate degree.

21st century
SHSU celebrated its 125th year of operation in 2004.

The university launched its first capital campaign in March 2016 with a $50 million goal and closed the campaign's books on August 31, 2010, with $61.2 million in commitments.  The university has 110,000 living, addressable alumni and an active Alumni Association with 10,000 members, holding 200 meetings and events annually.

On 30 May 2012, SHSU-The Woodlands Center opened on the Lone Star College-Montgomery campus. The facility includes  and has a five-story parking garage. The university also operates SHSU-University Park on the property of Lone Star College-University Park in unincorporated Harris County near Tomball.

Name changes
Throughout the course of its history, Sam has undergone a number of name changes:

 1879 (April 21): founded as Sam Houston Normal Institute
 1923: Sam Houston State Teachers College
 1965: Sam Houston State College
 1969: Sam Houston State University

In April 2007, Texas House Bill 1418 passed without objection in the Texas Legislature, preventing The Texas State University System's Board of Regents from changing the university's name to Texas State-Sam Houston.

Contrary to a popular joke—repeated by alumnus Dan Rather in his 1978 autobiography, The Camera Never Blinks—the school was never known as "Sam Houston Institute of Teaching" or "Sam Houston Institute of Technology." This joke was expanded in 2006 into an entire feature film, Accepted, which takes place on the campus of the fictional South Harmon Institute of Technology.

Main campus

Two large agricultural complexes feature a  teaching and research farm and a rodeo arena. The campus also features a planetarium, an observatory, a body farm, and an 18-hole golf course named The Bearkat Course. The mall area of the main campus includes Blatchley Bell Tower and Clock and a fountain.

The campus stood in for the fictional Austin University in the motion picture The Life of David Gale.

Academics

Sam Houston State's academic departments and programs are organized into eight colleges:

 College of Business Administration
 College of Criminal Justice
 College of Education
 College of Arts and Media
 College of Humanities and Social Sciences
 College of Science & Engineering Technology
 College of Health Sciences
 College of Osteopathic Medicine

Additionally, the university enrolls more than 350 high achieving undergraduate students in the selective Elliott T. Bowers Honors College.

Programs within the college of Criminal Justice were recently ranked by the Journal of Criminal Justice in the top five nationally. The theater and dance programs were ranked by Dance Spectrum Magazine in the top 25 nationally, and according to the National Dance Association, SHSU is home to quality athletic dance team. The university offers the only Professional Golf Management program in Texas, one of 20 in the country. SHSU also has one of the oldest speech and debate programs in the nation.

As of May 2016, the university offers:

Eighty-eight undergraduate degree programs
Fifty-nine masters' programs
Eight doctoral programs (Clinical Psychology, Counselor Education, Criminal Justice, Developmental Education Administration, Educational Leadership, Forensic Science, Instructional Systems Design & Technology, and Literacy)
Twenty-one certificates

College of Criminal Justice
SHSU's College of Criminal Justice is the largest and one of the oldest criminal justice programs in the nation. Huntsville has long been associated with criminal justice, being the co-headquarters of the Texas Department of Criminal Justice and the home of several prisons, including the Walls Unit which houses the state's execution chamber, located about two blocks north of the campus.

In 1970, the college became one of the first programs in the U.S. to offer the Ph.D. in criminal justice, and it was the first institution in the State of Texas to offer the Masters of Science in Forensic Science. SHSU's PhD in Clinical Science with a Forensic emphasis is one of seven such accredited programs in the U.S. The college faculty were recently recognized as the 4th most productive nationally in their field in terms of research, and their areas of expertise range from serial murder, hate crime, and terrorism to policing, law, corrections, and security.

The College of Criminal Justice includes the headquarters of the Texas Forensic Science Commission. It also houses the Bill Blackwood Law Enforcement Management Institute of Texas, which specializes in training for local, state, and federal law enforcement officers in the area of management and supervision. The college also houses a working courtroom where students can observe and analyze real trials.

Texas Studies
The university has been commended as of late for offering courses that encourage the study of the lore, the lure, and the history of the Lone Star State. In 2012, digital archivists at the university library worked with officials at a local veterans museum to launch the Texas Military Veterans Oral History collection.

Athletics 

Sam Houston State's colors are bright orange and white and their nickname is the Bearkats. Sam Houston sports teams participate in NCAA Division I (Championship Subdivision for football, or FCS) in the Western Athletic Conference through the 2022–23 school year, after which the program moves to the Football Bowl Subdivision (FBS) as a new member of Conference USA. The Sam Houston Bearkats won the 2020 NCAA Division I Football Championship over South Dakota State by a score of 23–21 and finished with a perfect 10–0 season record. The victory was the first Bearkat football national championship since the team won a share of the 1964 NAIA Championship. The 2020 season marked Sam Houston's third trip to the championship game in ten seasons.

SHSU's athletic teams have been nicknamed "The Bearkats" since 1923 when the university's name was changed by the Texas State Legislature from Sam Houston Normal Institute to Sam Houston State Teachers College. Prior to 1923, the varsity sports teams were nicknamed "The Normals".

It is doubtful those who coined the "Bearkat" nickname had a particular animal in mind. More likely, the name came from a popular local saying of the time, "tough as a Bearkat!" The late Reed Lindsey, who was a student/athlete in the 1920s and later retired as University registrar, once said that "it was a good fighting name of the time." Since the animal in the saying was thought more mythical than real, the spelling settled upon was "Bearkat." However, there are some arguments that the Sam Houston Bearkat is modeled after either a Binturong or a Kinkajou.

In the late 1940s, then SHSU president Harmon Lowman attempted to change the SHSU mascot from Bearkats to "Ravens" (after General Sam Houston's Cherokee nickname). Mrs. Vernon Schuder reported that the alumni were polled and she voted for the raven but that "all those old Bearkats beat us out!"

A Sammy Bearkat mascot character, with the later addition of a Samantha, began appearing at SHSU sports events in 1959. Samantha has since been retired.

Rivalry
SHSU's primary rival is Stephen F. Austin State University (SFA) and tensions between the two schools can run high before major sporting events that pit one against the other. The annual football game between SHSU and SFA, named the Battle of the Piney Woods, dates back to 1923. Since 2010, the series has been played at NRG Stadium in Houston. The game was not scheduled for the 2023–24 season after conference changes were announced.

Mascot

Sam Houston's Bearkat is represented by Sammy Bearkat, a costumed mascot, who has entertained and led crowds in cheers during sporting events since 1959.

Club sports
Club sports are very popular at SHSU. Some available to students include: powerlifting, ultimate frisbee, lacrosse, rugby, martial arts, trap and skeet, inline hockey, basketball, volleyball, soccer, tennis, and baseball.  In 2013 the Sam Houston quidditch team won the IQA World Cup VI Division 2 championship. The Spirit Programs, cheer, dance, and mascots, of Sam Houston hold the most National titles out of all of the sports and recreational activities at Sam Houston. The coed team is the reigning champions from NCA this past April. The All Girl team made school history by winning their first National Championship in April 2014.

Campus media
The SHSU School of Mass Communication operates KSHU, a student-run radio (90.5 FM) and television (cable channel 7) station, broadcasting news, sports, and entertainment programming for the campus and community. "The Houstonian" is the student-published twice-weekly campus newspaper. Broadcast studios and offices for all three media are located within the Dan Rather Communication Building.

The Alcalde was the university's annual yearbook, published from 1910 to 1998 and 2003 to 2006; it was named in honor of Texas Governor Oran Roberts, whose nickname was "The Old Alcalde".

Affiliated institutions
The university operates a charter school network: the administrative offices are on the university grounds in Huntsville, but all of the charter schools are in Greater Houston. The network began in 2017 as laboratory schools. The university chose to use space in daycare facilities to host its charter campuses.
 Brighton Academy (K-6)
 Cypress Trails (K-5)
 Greengate Academy (K-5)
 Spring Woods (K-2) - Located at Spring Woods United Methodist Church

Notable alumni
 Dana Andrews, actor
 Michael Bankston, former U.S. football player
 Fred Beene, former MLB Pitcher
 Ray Benge former MLB pitcher
 Rhett Bomar, former U.S. football player
 Ken Boswell, former MLB second baseman
 Jeremiah Briscoe, former U.S football player
 Katie Rose Clarke, actress
 Priscilla Coleman, artist
 Jerry Coker, jazz educator
 Davion Davis, current U.S. football player free agent
 Keith Davis, former U.S. football player
 Mary DeChambres, film and television picture editor
 Tim Denton, former U.S. football player
 Lachlan Edwards, current U.S. football player
 Ashley Etienne
 John Ferling author, historian, professor
 Victoria Gonzales AKA Raquel Rodriguez, WWE professional wrestler 
 Billy Gunn, WWE professional wrestler
 P. J. Hall, current U.S. football player
 Keith Heinrich, former U.S. football player
 Phil Hennigan, former MLB pitcher
 Abby Johnson, activist
 Bryce Johnson, outfielder for the MLB San Francisco Giants
 Matt Langwell, former MLB pitcher
 Richard Linklater, movie director
 Dustin Long, former U.S. football player
 Marcus Luttrell, former U.S. Navy Seal
 Rick Matula former MLB pitcher
 Josh McCown, current U.S. football player
 Joel McDonald, voice actor 
 Austin Odom, Businessman
 Ryan O'Hearn current MLB first baseman for Kansas City Royals
 Dan Rather, journalist
 Ralph Ruthstrom, former U.S. football player
 Shea Serrano, author
 Thaksin Shinawatra, former Thai prime minister
 Caleb Smith current MLB pitcher
 Steve Sparks, former MLB pitcher, broadcaster
 Jordan Tata, former MLB pitcher
 Ryan Tepera current MLB pitcher
 Don Welchel, former MLB pitcher
 Phillip Wellman, U.S. baseball coach
 Charlie Wilson, former U.S. politician
 Dusty Wolfe, former professional wrestler, current history teacher
William Garrett Wright, poet

See also

Steamboat House

Notes

References

External links

 
 Sam Houston State Athletics website

 
Educational institutions established in 1879
Huntsville, Texas
Education in Walker County, Texas
Buildings and structures in Walker County, Texas
Universities and colleges accredited by the Southern Association of Colleges and Schools
Sam Houston
Sam Houston State University
1879 establishments in Texas